Tania Oktaviani Kusumah (born 13 October 1998) is an Indonesian badminton player. She is a women's doubles specialist, and has trained at the Djarum club since 2010. In 2015, she won the Maybank Malaysia Youth International. One year later, she reached rank 3 at the Yonex Polish Open, at the Walikota Surabaya Victor International Series and at the Smiling Fish International Challenge. She also finished in the second place at the 2016 India International and 2017 Singapore International. Together with Vania Arianti Sukoco, they won the women's doubles title at the National Championships in Pangkal Pinang.

Achievements

BWF World Tour (1 title) 
The BWF World Tour, which was announced on 19 March 2017 and implemented in 2018, is a series of elite badminton tournaments sanctioned by the Badminton World Federation (BWF). The BWF World Tour is divided into levels of World Tour Finals, Super 1000, Super 750, Super 500, Super 300 (part of the HSBC World Tour), and the BWF Tour Super 100.

Women's doubles

BWF International Challenge/Series (1 title, 2 runners-up) 
Women's doubles

  BWF International Challenge tournament
  BWF International Series tournament

Performance timeline

National team 
 Junior level

 Senior level

Individual competitions 
 Junior level

 Senior level

References

External links 
 

1998 births
Living people
Sportspeople from Bandung
Indonesian female badminton players
21st-century Indonesian women